The Birth of John the Baptist may refer to:

 The Birth of John the Baptist (Ghirlandaio), a Renaissance-era painting by Domenico Ghirlandaio
 The Birth of John the Baptist (film), a 2003 animated film
 The Birth of John the Baptist, a Christian feast day